The following contains a list of notable alumni of Berklee College of Music. Members of this list have attended Berklee for at least one full-time semester  (not including honorary degrees or summer programs) and are notable in their respective field in the music industry. Some list members may have achieved notability in the entertainment industry unrelated to music, or may be notable for achievements not related to music or entertainment.

* Designates did not complete degree/diploma program.  In parentheses is year of graduation.

List

A

John Abercrombie (1967)
Aruna Abrams
Arooj Aftab
Toshiko Akiyoshi (1959)
Cheche Alara (1994)
Amy Allen (2015)
Loren Allred
Eric André (2005)
Ingrid Andress
Ivory Aquino
 Dave Askren
Mulatu Astatke (1959)

B

Victor Bailey (1979)
Andrew Bayer (2009)
Kenny Beats
Marco Benevento (1999)
Jeff Berlin (1978)
Sanjeeta Bhattacharya
Cindy Blackman (1980)
John Blackwell (1995)
Bleu
Tangelene Bolton (2013)
Tracy Bonham (1989)
Jenn Bostic
Libbi Bosworth (early 1990s)
Alan Broadbent (1969)
Gary Burton (1962)

C

Will Calhoun of Living Colour (1986)
Arturo Cardelus (2011)
Terri Lyne Carrington (1983)
Cyrus Chestnut (1985)
Toby Chu (1999)
Chancellor
Chiara Civello (2000)
Alf Clausen (1966)
Cobi
Bruce Cockburn (1965)
Vinnie Colaiuta (1975)
Paula Cole (1990)
Charlie Colin of Train
Vanessa Collier (2013)

D

Mike Daly (1996)
Adam Deitch (1998)
Kenwood Dennard (1973)*
Kelly Derrickson
 Bruno Destrez (1989)
Al Di Meola (1974)*
Ramin Djawadi (1998)

E

 Emily Elbert (2011)
 Empress Of
 Maria Entraigues-Abramson (1994)
 Booker Ervin*
 Melissa Etheridge (1980)*, returned to receive honorary doctorate 2006
 Kevin Eubanks (1979)

F

Benny Faccone (1978)
Donald Fagen (1965)*
Rachelle Ferrell (1980)*
Melissa Ferrick (1990)*
Bill Frisell (1977)
Richard Furch (1999)

G

Albhy Galuten (1968)
Roopam Garg
Anthony Geraci
Melvin Gibbs
Richard Gibbs
Shane Gibson of Korn
Mick Goodrick (1967)
Catriona Gray
Juan Luis Guerra (1982)

H

Jan Hammer (1969)
Roy Hargrove (1989)*
Donald Harrison (1983)
Antonio Hart (1991)
Juliana Hatfield (1990)
Lalah Hathaway (1994)
Tom Hedden
Amy Heidemann of Karmin (2011)
Alan Hewitt (1977)
Norihiko Hibino (1997)
Bob Holz (1977)* 
Bruce Hornsby (1974)*
Rob Hotchkiss of Train
Sierra Hull (2011)
Ian Hultquist of Passion Pit (2008)

J

Bob James (1958)*
Joelle James (2011)
Keith Jarrett (1963)*
Wyclef Jean
Ingrid Jensen (1989)*
Laney Jones (2014)*
Quincy Jones (1951)*

K

Geoffrey Keezer*
Kenzie (Kim Yeon Jung), South Korean composer for SM Entertainment
Kiesza
Diana Krall (1983)
Joe Kraemer (1993)
Joey Kramer of Aerosmith

L

Abe Laboriel (1972)
Abe Laboriel Jr. (1993)
Alex Lacamoire (1995)
Michelle Lambert (2011)
Patty Larkin (1974)
Henry Lau (2010)*
Laufey (2021)
Wang Leehom (1999)
Adrianne Lenker (2012) of Big Thief
Daniel Levitin (1979)
Josh Linkner (1988)
Aubrey Logan (2010)
Andres Levin
Ken Lewis (1991)
Henning Lohner

M

Natalie Maines (1995)* of The Chicks
Eddie Manion (1970s)
Aimee Mann (1980)* of 'Til Tuesday
Kevin March (early 1990s), drummer of Guided by Voices, The Dambuilders, Shudder to Think
Arif Mardin (1961)
Charlie Mariano (1951)
Eric Marienthal (1979)
Branford Marsalis (1980)
Delfeayo Marsalis (1989)
Tony Maserati (1986)
Rob Mathes (1984)
John Mayer (1998)*
Steve Mazur (2000) of Our Lady Peace
Lizzy McAlpine.
Donny McCaslin (1988)
Keith McEachern (2005) of The Wandas
Ben McKee*, bassist of Imagine Dragons
David McWane, lead vocalist of Big D and the Kids Table
Filipe Melo (2000) Portuguese pianist, filmmaker and writer
Dominic Miller, guitarist
Harry Miree (2013), drummer
Rieko Miyoshi (2003), stage name Kotringo
Sebastian Arocha Morton (1997)
Rob Mounsey (1975)
George Mraz (1970)
John Myung* of Dream Theater

N

 Ouyang Nana - Taiwanese cellist, pianist, guitarist
 Adam Neely (2009) - bass player and YouTuber.
 Reiko Nakano (2005) - violinist.
Paul Nowell (2007), stage name Paul The Trombonist

O

Atli Örvarsson (1996)
Oyinda (2013)

P

John Paesano (2000)
Trey Parker*
Katarina Pejak*
Heitor Pereira*
Danilo Perez (1988)
Mark Petrie of PostHaste Music
John Petrucci* of Dream Theater
Chico Pinheiro (1998)
Daniel Platzman (2009), drummer of Imagine Dragons
Mike Portnoy* of The Winery Dogs, formerly of Adrenaline Mob and Dream Theater
Taylor and Blake Powell*
Sergio Prezioso (2012)
Psy (Park Jae-sang)
Charlie Puth (2013)

R

Sara Rachele (2013)
AJ Rafael (2010)
Rahul Raj
David Rawlings 
Niki Reiser
Emily Remler
Bob Reynolds (2000)
David Robidoux
MJ Rodriguez (2011)
Ed Roland of Collective Soul
Wallace Roney (1981)*
Charlie Rosen
Kurt Rosenwinkel (1990)*
Rashawn Ross (2000)

S

Randy Sabien (1977), jazz violinist and music educator
Gerard Salonga (1998) 
Princess Mafalda von Saxe-Coburg-Gotha
St. Vincent (Annie Clark) (2004)
Bobby Sanabria (1979), multi-Grammy nominated drummer, percussionist, educator, bandleader
Rosan Sashida (2010) 
Allison Scagliotti (2015)
Sarah Schachner
Pieter Schlosser (2002)
Mike Schmid (2001)
John Scofield (1973)
Christian Scott (2004)
Michael Semanick (1985)
Wayne Sermon (2008), guitarist of Imagine Dragons
Benny Sharoni
Sonny Sharrock (1962)
Rasika Shekar (2017)
Derek Sherinian (1984)
Howard Shore (1969)
Ryan Shore (1996)
Alan Silvestri (1970)
Allan Slutsky (1978)
Brendon Small (1997) of Dethklok
Steve Smith (1976), drummer for the rock group Journey
Luísa Sobral (2009)
Jason Solowsky (2000) 
Soo Wincci (2019)
Luciana Souza (1992)
Esperanza Spalding (2005)
Billy Squier*
Sid Sriram (2008) a singer in South Indian film industry
Mike Stern (1975)
Joel Stroetzel of Killswitch Engage
Tierney Sutton (1987)
Svoy (2003)
Antonio Sánchez

T

Susan Tedeschi (1991)
Chloe Temtchine, singer-songwriter
Jacky Terrasson (1986)
Ian Thornley of Thornley, Big Wreck
Pinar Toprak (2000)
Néstor Torres (1973)
Brian Transeau (1990)
Justin Tranter (2001)
Sarah Tudzin (2014), of rock band Illuminati Hotties

U

Hiromi Uehara (2003)
Kelvin Underwood (2003), drum set and taiko musician

V

Steve Vai (1979)
Brian Vibberts (1991)
Emil Viklický (1978)
Lucas Vidal (2007)
James Valentine of Maroon 5

W

Sadao Watanabe (1965)
Ernie Watts (1966)
Jeff "Tain" Watts (1981)
Roy Wang (2019) 
Gillian Welch (1992)
Kenny Werner (1968)
Mark Whitfield (1987)
Brad Whitford  of Aerosmith (1971)
Ashlyn Willson (2015)
Betty Who
Anna Wise (2010)
Natalie Wynn

Z

Geoff Zanelli (1996)
Marcelo Zarvos
Joe Zawinul (1959)
Jeremy Zuckerman

References

Berklee College of Music alumni
Berklee College of Music alumni
Berklee College of Music
Berklee College of Music alumni
Berklee College of Music alumni